Trafficking protein particle complex subunit 10 is a protein that in humans is encoded by the TRAPPC10 gene.

The protein encoded by this gene is a transmembrane protein found in the cis-Golgi complex. The encoded protein is part of the multisubunit transport protein particle (TRAPP) complex and may be involved in vesicular transport from the endoplasmic reticulum to the Golgi. 

Mutations in this gene could be responsible for the Unverricht-Lundborg type of progressive myoclonus epilepsy, or for autoimmune polyglandular disease type 1. Two transcript variants encoding different isoforms have been found for this gene.

References

Further reading